Julian Wililams (born March 23, 1990) is an American football wide receiver who is currently a free agent. He played collegiately at Marian University in Indianapolis, Indiana.

Professional career

Chicago Blitz
In February 2014, Williams signed with the Chicago Blitz of the Continental Indoor Football League (CIFL).

Iowa Barnstormers
On February 20, 2014, Williams was assigned to the Iowa Barnstormers of the Arena Football League (AFL).

Orlando Predators
Williams was assigned to the Orlando Predators on October 3, 2014. On March 22, 2015, Williams was placed on recallable reassignment.

Return to Iowa
On April 22, 2015, William returned to the Barnstormers. He was released on May 5, 2015.

Return to Orlando
On May 6, 2015, Williams was assigned to the Orlando Predators.

Arizona Rattlers
On February 23, 2016, Williams was assigned to the Arizona Rattlers.

Chicago Eagles
On April 7, 2016, Williams was assigned to Chicago Eagles.

References

External links
 Iowa Barnstormers Bio

1990 births
Living people
American football wide receivers
Marian Knights football players
Chicago Blitz (indoor football) players
Iowa Barnstormers players
Orlando Predators players
Arizona Rattlers players
Chicago Eagles players